The 1982 Society of West End Theatre Awards were held in 1982 in London celebrating excellence in West End theatre by the Society of West End Theatre. The awards would not become the Laurence Olivier Awards, as they are known today, until the 1984 ceremony.

Winners and nominees
Details of winners (in bold) and nominees, in each award category, per the Society of London Theatre.

Productions with multiple nominations and awards
The following 17 productions, including one ballet, received multiple nominations:

 6: Guys and Dolls
 4: 84 Charing Cross Road, Another Country, Insignificance and Poppy
 3: A Doll's House, The Beggar's Opera and The Importance of Being Earnest
 2: A Midsummer Night's Dream, Andy Capp, Le songe d'une nuit d'été, Noises Off, Song and Dance, The Pirates of Penzance, Uncle Vanya, Underneath the Arches and Windy City

The following four productions received multiple awards:

 5: Guys and Dolls
 2: A Doll's House, Another Country and Poppy

See also
 36th Tony Awards

References

External links
 Previous Olivier Winners – 1982

Laurence Olivier Awards ceremonies
Laurence Olivier Awards, 1982
Laurence Olivier Awards
Laurence Olivier Awards